Gordonia otitidis is a bacterium from the genus Gordonia which has been isolated from a patient with external otitis in Japan.

References

External links 
Type strain of Gordonia otitidis at BacDive -  the Bacterial Diversity Metadatabase

Mycobacteriales
Bacteria described in 2005